Don Randi (born February 25, 1937) is an American keyboard player, bandleader, and songwriter who was a member of the Wrecking Crew.

Career
Randi was born February 25, 1937, in New York City. He was raised in the Catskill Mountains and studied classical music. In 1954, he moved to Los Angeles and became a studio musician. During the next year, he began working at record distribution company where he was influenced by jazz musicians, particularly Horace Silver.

He began his career as a pianist and keyboard player in 1956, gradually establishing a reputation as a leading session musician. In the early 1960s, he was musician and arranger for record producer Phil Spector's Wall of Sound. He played piano on "These Boots Are Made For Walkin'" by Nancy Sinatra and on her albums, as well as being a member of her touring band for decades. He performed on the Beach Boys' "Good Vibrations" and "God Only Knows". His piano can be heard on the Buffalo Springfield songs "Expecting to Fly" and "Broken Arrow". He claims to have played on over three hundred hit records, working with Linda Ronstadt (the harpsichord on "Different Drum"), Quincy Jones, Cannonball Adderley, Herb Alpert, Sarah Vaughan, Lee Hazlewood and Frank Zappa. He recorded live albums of piano jazz as a solo performer and as the leader of the Don Randi Trio with Leroy Vinnegar and Mel Lewis. Randi wrote film scores during the 1970s, including Bloody Mama (1970), Up in the Cellar (1970), J. W. Coop (1972), Stacey (1973), and Santee (1973).

In 1970, he opened The Baked Potato jazz club in Studio City, California, and formed Don Randi and Quest as the house band. The band recorded over 15 albums and was nominated for a Grammy Award in 1980 for the album New Baby. In 2010, the Baked Potato was named Best Jazz Club by Los Angeles magazine.

In 2008, as a member of the Wrecking Crew, Randi was inducted into the Hollywood RockWalk.

Discography

As leader
 Feelin' Like Blues (World Pacific, 1960)
 Where Do We Go from Here? (Verve, 1962)
 Last Night/with the Don Randi Trio (Verve, 1962)
 Mexican Pearls (Palomar, 1965)
 Revolver Jazz (Reprise, 1966)
 Live On the Sunset Strip! (Reprise, 1967)
 3 in the Cellar (American International, 1970)
 At the Baked Potato (Poppy, 1972)
 Don Randi & the Baked Potato Band (JAS, 1975)
 Bermuda Triangle (Dobre, 1978)
 New Baby (Sheffield Lab, 1979)
 California 84 (Bee Pee, 1983)
 Baked Potato Shuffle (Baked Potato, 1988)
 Don't Look Back (Headfirst, 1989)
 Wind and Sea (Headfirst, 1990)

As sideman
With David Axelrod
 Songs of Experience (Capitol, 1969)
 Earth Rot (Capitol, 1970)
 Strange Ladies (MCA, 1977)
 David Axelrod (Mo Wax, 2001)

With others
 Susie Allanson, Susie Allanson (ABC, 1976)
 Harold Betters, Funk City Express (Reprise, 1966)
 Bob B. Soxx & the Blue Jeans, Zip-A-Dee Doo Dah (Philles, 1976)
 Pat Boone, Texas Woman (Hitsville, 1976)
 James Brown, It's a New Day So Let a Man Come In (King, 1970)
 James Brown, Get On the Good Foot (Polydor, 1993)
 Roy Brown, Hard Times (Bluesway, 1973)
 Thumbs Carllile, On His Own (Gemini, 1973)
 Jerry Cole, Outer Limits (Capitol, 1963)
 Cass Elliot, Cass Elliot (RCA Victor, 1972)
 England Dan & John Ford Coley, Fables (A&M, 1972)
 Gale Garnett, Gale Garnett Sings About Flying & Rainbows & Love & Other Groovy Things (RCA Victor, 1967)
 Lee Hazlewood, The N.S.V.I.P.'s (Reprise, 1964)
 Lee Hazlewood, Love and Other Crimes (Reprise, 1968)
 Jack Jones, What I Did for Love (RCA Victor, 1975)
 Dean Martin, Once in a While (Reprise, 1978)
 Bette Midler, Broken Blossom (Atlantic, 1977)
 The Monkees, Listen to the Band (Rhino, 1991)
 Sandy Nelson, Rock 'n' Roll Revival (Imperial, 1968)
 Jack Nitzsche, The Lonely Surfer (Reprise, 1963)
 Michelle Phillips, Victim of Romance (A&M, 1990)
 Elvis Presley, NBC-TV Special (RCA, 1991)
 Michael Quatro, Gettin' Ready (Prodigal, 1977)
 Emitt Rhodes, The American Dream (A&M, 1970)
 Nelson Riddle, Contemporary Sound of Nelson Riddle (United Artists, 1968)
 Tommy Roe, Beginnings (ABC, 1971)
 The Ronettes, Presenting the Fabulous Ronettes Featuring Veronica (Philles, 1964)
 Nancy Sinatra, Sugar (Reprise, 1966)
 Stone Poneys, Evergreen Vol. 2 (Capitol, 1967)
 Townes Van Zandt, Our Mother the Mountain (Poppy, 1969)
 Stephanie Winslow, Crying (Warner Bros., 1980)

Notable singles
Based on information from Randi’s book, You’ve Heard These Hands.

Charting for singles is on the US singles charts.

Notable albums
A list of notable albums that Randi played on.

References

External links
Official website 
 Don Randi at Discogs.com
Deane Ogden podcast, March 12, 2014
Don Randi Interview - NAMM Oral History Library (2016)

1937 births
Living people
Jazz musicians from New York (state)
Songwriters from New York (state)
Musicians from New York City
Musicians from New York (state)
20th-century American male musicians
20th-century American pianists
21st-century American male musicians
21st-century American pianists
American jazz pianists
American male jazz musicians
American male pianists
American pop pianists
American session musicians
The Wrecking Crew (music) members
American male songwriters